Pictures of You may refer to:

 "Pictures of You" (The Cure song), 1990 
 "Pictures of You" (The Last Goodnight song), 2007
 "Pictures of You", a 2013 song by Bon Jovi on the album What About Now
 "Pictures of You", a 2008 song by Bad Boys Blue on the album Heart & Soul
 "Pictures of You", a 1983 song by Oingo Boingo on the album Good for Your Soul
 "Pictures of You" (One Tree Hill), an episode of One Tree Hill
 Pictures of You, a novel by Caroline Leavitt
 Pictures of You (TV series), an Australian television series

See also
Picture of You (disambiguation)